Indian ice cream may refer to:

 Indian ice cream (Alaska) of Alaskan Athabaskans
 Indian ice cream (Canada) (or sxusem) of First Nations in British Columbia 
 kulfi (or Indian ice cream) from Indian Subcontinent of Asia

See also
 Eskimo ice cream (disambiguation)
 Ice cream (disambiguation)
 Indian (disambiguation)